Gun Justice is a 1933 American Western film directed by Alan James and written by Robert Quigley. The film stars Ken Maynard, Cecilia Parker, Hooper Atchley, Walter Miller, William Gould and Jack Rockwell. The film was released on December 11, 1933, by Universal Pictures.

Cast 
Ken Maynard as Ken Lance
Cecilia Parker as Ray Marsh
Hooper Atchley as Sam Burkett
Walter Miller as Chris Hogan
William Gould as Jones
Jack Rockwell as Hank Rivers
Sheldon Lewis as Lawyer Hawkins
Ed Brady as Denver
Fred MacKaye as Ken Lance imposter 
William Dyer as Red Hogan 
Jack Richardson as Sheriff
Edward Coxen as Jim Lance 
Lafe McKee as Postmaster
Tarzan as Tarzan

References

External links 
 

1933 films
American Western (genre) films
1933 Western (genre) films
Universal Pictures films
Films directed by Alan James
American black-and-white films
1930s English-language films
1930s American films